Robert Emms (born Robert James MacPherson; 20 May 1986) is a British film, stage and television actor, known for portraying Pythagoras in the BBC One fantasy-adventure series Atlantis, and Leonid Toptunov in HBO's Miniseries Chernobyl.

Early life
Emms was born in Horley, Surrey, England. He went to a local secondary school, Oakwood School, Horley. He studied at the BRIT School for Performing Arts and Technology from 2002 to 2004, and then the London Academy of Music and Dramatic Art (LAMDA) from 2004 to 2007.

Career
In March 2009 Emms played the lead role of Albert in the National Theatre's production of War Horse. After Steven Spielberg saw him in War Horse at the New London Theatre, he was cast as David Lyons in Spielberg's film adaptation of the play.

In June 2011 Screen International named him as a 'Star of Tomorrow'.

His other film work includes Kick-Ass 2 alongside Jim Carrey, and Rick 'Broken' Buckley in Broken directed by Rufus Norris for BBC films. He appeared as the Elizabethan playwright Thomas Dekker in Anonymous directed by Roland Emmerich, in
Tarsem Singh's version of the Brothers Grimm's Snow White, in Mirror Mirror, with Julia Roberts and in the BAFTA-nominated film The Arbor, directed by Clio Barnard. More recently he has portrayed Vitas Gerulaitis in the film Borg/McEnroe directed by Janus Metz Pederson (alongside Shia LaBeouf).

Emms' notable television appearances include Happy Valley by Sally Wainwright, The Street by Jimmy McGovern, and Scott & Bailey. In 2015, Emms played the part of Smitty, the artistic grandson of Petunia Howe, in the three-part BBC series Capital based on John Lanchester's novel of the same name. Most recently he portrays John Gerard in the BBC series Gunpowder alongside Kit Harington and Liv Tyler. He also played Pythagoras in the series Atlantis for the BBC.

Emms played Jack in Jurassic World: Fallen Kingdom (2018) and the third season of Jurassic World Camp Cretaceous (2021).

Filmography

Film

Television

Theatre

References

External links

Emms' page at Curtis Brown

1986 births
English male film actors
English male stage actors
English male television actors
Living people